James Blanck (born 20 November 2000) is a professional Australian rules footballer with the Hawthorn Football Club in the Australian Football League (AFL).

Early career
Blanck had spent three seasons at Box Hill, the first year (2020) was wiped out because of Covid restrictions, in 2021 he was coached by now Hawthorn coach Sam Mitchell who helped him develop into a dour defender who uses his athleticism to team advantage.  list management team  kept a close eye on him, where he emerged as one of the best backmen in the VFL.

AFL career
Blanck was the sixteenth player picked in the 2022 mid-season draft, having made an impression playing for Box Hill Hawks in the Victorian Football League.

Statistics
Updated to the end of the 2022 season.

|-
| 2022 ||  || 36
| 9 || 0 || 0 || 42 || 25 || 67 || 15 || 14 || 0.0 || 0.0 || 4.7 || 2.8 || 7.4 || 1.7 || 1.6 || 0
|- class="sortbottom"
! colspan=3| Career
! 9 !! 0 !! 0 !! 42 !! 25 !! 67 !! 15 !! 14 !! 0.0 !! 0.0 !! 4.7 !! 2.8 !! 7.4 !! 1.7 !! 1.6 !! 0
|}

References

External links
James Blanck profile

Living people
2000 births
Hawthorn Football Club players
Box Hill Football Club players